Schull or Skull (or Scoil Mhuire, meaning "Mary's School") is a town in County Cork, Ireland.

Located on the southwest coast of Ireland in the municipal district of West Cork, the town is dominated by Mount Gabriel (407 m). It has a sheltered harbour, used for recreational boating. The area, on the peninsula leading to Mizen Head, is a tourist destination, and there are numerous holiday homes along the adjoining coast. Schull had a population of 700 in 2016. The town's secondary school, Schull Community College, houses one of the only planetariums in Ireland, along with a sailing school. Each year Schull harbour hosts the Fastnet International Schools Regatta.

Name
The first recorded place name for this area is "scol", from a Decretal Letter of Pope Innocent III in 1199 to the bishop of Cork confirming the rights of the bishop of Cork. Both Skull and Skul are used in the Down Survey of 1656–58. Skull is also used in the Grand Jury Map surveyed in the 1790s and published 1811.

The Placenames (County Cork) Order of 2012 lists "An Scoil" as the Irish name for the village, in which "Scoil" is translated from "school". This is attributed by some to a school which was ostensibly located in the area.

However, others question this derivation, and Gary Dempsey's thesis ("Whispered in the Landscape/Written on the Street, A Study of Placename Policy and Conflict in Ireland from 1946 to 2010") suggests that the "Scoil Mhuire" form dates to 1893 when the parish priest of Schull at the time, Very Rev. John O’Connor (P.P. Schull 1888–1911), who "fancied himself as a historian, misread a Latin sentence as referring to a 'College of St. Mary' in Skull; in fact, the text referred to a collegiate church in Waterford but the PP had set the ball rolling".

History
In the early 17th century, the nearby townland of Leamcon was a pirate stronghold, at a time when pirates traded easily in nearby Baltimore and Whiddy Island.

Transport
Schull once had its own railway station, which was the western terminus of the Schull and Skibbereen Railway, a steam-operated narrow gauge railway. Schull railway station opened on 6 September 1886, closed for passenger and goods traffic on 27 January 1947, and finally closed altogether on 1 June 1953.

The main bus route is Bus Éireann's number 237 to/from Cork City, though only some services reach Schull. Also, on occasional days there are buses to/from other towns/villages in the local area.

There is a ferry service between Schull and Cape Clear Island.

In literature 
The book Silver River (2007) by Daisy Goodwin includes a section on the efforts of her 3x great-grandfather, the Rector of Skull, to help the populace during the Great Famine.

Notable people
 Fionn Ferreira, scientist and winner of the 2019 Google Science Fair, attended Schull Community College.
 Timothy O'Hea, recipient of the Victoria Cross was born in the area
 Ralph Allan Sampson, astronomer, born here
 John Sampson, linguist and Romani scholar, born here
 Sophie Toscan du Plantier, French television producer murdered on the night of 23 December 1996
 Robert Traill (1793–1847), the local rector, who was notable for his efforts to alleviate suffering during the Great Irish Famine.
 Colin Vearncombe, English singer-songwriter, known  professionally as Black,  lived in Schull

References

External links

Schull.ie Website

Towns and villages in County Cork
Pirate dens and locations